The 2021 Rijeka local elections were the elections for the 15th mayor of Rijeka, the two deputy mayors and the 31 members of the Rijeka City Council. It was a part of the Croatian local elections which were held on 16 May 2021.
The incumbent mayor, Vojko Obersnel of the Social Democratic Party (SDP), announced on 6 November 2020 that he would be retiring at the end of his sixth consecutive term in office. The first round saw Marko Filipović (30.25%) and Davor Štimac (16.10%). Filipović is defending the "long-time stronghold" of the SDP against independent centre-right candidate Štimac.

Results

Mayoral election

City council election

Serbian minority by-election

Opinion polls

Mayoral election

First round

Second round

Rijeka City Council

Aftermath
The constituent session of the city council was held on June 29 at the Croatian Cultural Center in Sušak. Ana Trošelj (PGS) was elected president of the council, and Josip Ostrogović (HDZ) and Željko Jovanović (SDP) were elected vice presidents. The majority in the council will be made up of the SDP coalition and the coalition of PGS and Labor, while the opposition includes HDZ, Most and the coalition of AM, UK and Alternativa.

Due to the failure to represent the representatives of the Serbian national minority in the council, by-elections were announced for October 3, 2021 for the election of one representative of the minority. This will increase the number of representatives in the council to 32.

See also
List of mayors in Croatia
2021 Zagreb local elections
2021 Split local elections
2021 Osijek local elections

References 

Rijeka 2021
Rijeka
Rijeka local